Mattia Valoti (born 6 September 1993) is an Italian professional footballer who plays as a midfielder for  club Monza.

Club career

Early career
Valoti was born in Vicenza on 6 September 1993, the son of former footballer Aladino Valoti, who played for several Serie A and Serie B teams during the late 1980s and 1990s and was the director of football at Albinoleffe.

Mattia started playing football at the age of 5 in the youth team of Lucchese, the club where his father was playing at the time. Over the next eight years, Mattia played for several clubs, namely Cosenza, Palermo, Crotone, Martina Franca and Dalmine Futura, as a result of his father's transfers.

Albinoleffe
In 2006, Valoti settled at AlbinoLeffe, spending five seasons in the club's youth system. He went on to make his professional debut, aged 17, coming on as a substitute in a Coppa Italia game against Crotone, on 27 October 2010. Three days later, he also made his Serie B debut, again coming off the bench in a match against Novara.

During the January 2011 transfer window, Serie A club AC Milan signed Valoti on a co-ownership deal worth €800,000, though they allowed Albinoleffe to keep him on loan for the remainder of the season.

AC Milan

At the beginning of the 2011–12 campaign, the co-ownership deal was renewed and Valoti joined Milan, taking part in the pre-season trainings and friendlies with the first team. However, he did not make any official appearance during his first season with the Rossoneri and instead he played mainly with the Primavera (under-20) team.

For the 2012–13 season, the co-ownership was extended again. However, Valoti still made no appearances for the first team (instead featuring as an overage player for the Primavera team, which is now an under-19 team) and during the January transfer window he was loaned out to his former club Albinoleffe.

Return to AlbinoLeffe
Valoti returned to AlbinoLeffe in temporary deal on 24 January 2013. In June 2013 the co-ownership was renewed. On 25 July Milan extended the temporary deal of Valoti at AlbinoLeffe. On 20 June 2014, Milan sold Valoti back to AlbinoLeffe for €400,000 fee. However, AlbinoLeffe decided to sell Valoti again on 15 July.

Verona
On 15 July 2014, Valoti signed for Serie A club Verona in a temporary deal, with an option to buy. His permanent transfer was confirmed on 7 July 2015, after AlbinoLeffe had relegated from professional leagues.

On 23 July 2015, Valoti joined Pescara on loan along with Pierluigi Cappelluzzo (loan) and Francesco Zampano (definitive).

On 1 February 2016, Valoti signed for Livorno.

SPAL
On 6 July 2018, Valoti signed with SPAL on loan until 30 June 2019. On 1 July 2019, Valoti signed with SPAL.

Monza
On 12 July 2021, Valoti joined Serie B side Monza on a one-year loan with a conditional obligation to buy. He made his debut on 11 September, in a 1–1 league draw against his former club SPAL. Valoti's first goal for Monza came on 27 November, equalising against Ascoli in a 1–1 draw. Following Monza's Serie A promotion on 29 May 2022, Valoti's obligation for purchase clause was triggered.

Career statistics

Honours
AC Milan
 Supercoppa Italiana: 2011

References

External links

 Profile at A.C. Monza 
 Profile at aic.football.it 

Living people
1993 births
Sportspeople from Vicenza
Footballers from Veneto
Italian footballers
Association football midfielders
S.S.D. Lucchese 1905 players
Cosenza Calcio 1914 players
Palermo F.C. players
F.C. Crotone players
A.S.D. Martina Calcio 1947 players
U.C. AlbinoLeffe players
A.C. Milan players
Hellas Verona F.C. players
Delfino Pescara 1936 players
U.S. Livorno 1915 players
S.P.A.L. players
A.C. Monza players
Serie A players
Serie B players
Serie C players
Italy youth international footballers